Restless Natives is a 1985 Scottish cinema adventure comedy, directed by Michael Hoffman.

Plot
The story follows the adventures of two Scottish youths from the Wester Hailes district of Edinburgh, played by Vincent Friell and Joe Mullaney, who, in rebellion to their drab lives in urban Scotland in the mid-1980s, become modern highwaymen. Donning masks of a clown and a wolf-man and riding a Suzuki GP 125 motorbike, for a joke they waylay and hold up with a toy gun tourist coaches in the Highlands, in the process becoming a tourist attraction themselves. Having inadvertently acquired substantial amounts of money, they proceed to become modern Robin Hoods, doling it out to the poor of their city by scattering it on bike rides through its streets, attracting national media attention and pursuit by the police.

In the end, after temporarily escaping the police, they try to hold up another coach but it is not driven by a woman as it first seems but by a man (Ned Beatty) who has been pursuing them. The police catch up and they are arrested. But a man representing the Secretary of State for Scotland releases them because they have increased Scottish tourism by 15%. He instead organises a fake crash to explain their demise, with their identities still unknown.

Themes
Restless Natives—as suggested by its title—has underlying themes beyond its superficial presentation as a light social comedy film.  It was produced at a time of high unemployment in the United Kingdom, with Scotland being particularly affected by post-industrial economic blight, and being governed from London by a Conservative party that the Scottish people had electorally rejected in the recent 1983 United Kingdom general election. The main storyline's premise reflected the frustration of mid-1980s Scottish working class youth, using the freedom facilitated by a motorcycle to escape into revitalizing open vistas of the landscape of the Scottish Highlands. The production was a part of a group of small-budget cinematic productions, along with titles such as Gregory's Girl (1981) and Local Hero (1983), that brought stories of contemporary life in Scotland to a global cinema audience. The film acquired cult status, being regarded as a homemade expression of local Scottish cultural pride, becoming a minor media source of insurgent Scottish cultural identity, subliminally juxtaposed to Britishness, and feeding into the developing proto–Scottish Nationalist movement in the arts, with its distinctive soundtrack from the band Big Country, whose music dealt with the same themes.

Music score
The soundtrack features music from the band Big Country.  This music was not released on an album but was combined into two lengthy tracks, each featuring various pieces of music and clips of actors from the film's audio, which appeared on limited edition formats of two Big Country 12" singles.  The soundtrack was released on CD for the first time on the 1998 Big Country collection Restless Natives & Rarities, where it is presented as a single 35-minute track.

Production
The screenplay won a film script writing competition held by Lloyds Bank before it was optioned for production.

Reception
The film performed well at the box office in Scotland, but commercially failed in other markets.

See also
 Restless Nation

References

External links
 
 Dear Scotland: You have been watching... Restless Natives (review)
 The Skinny: Cult Movie Column - Restless Natives

1985 films
1980s adventure comedy films
British comedy films
Scottish films
Films set in Scotland
Entertainment in Scotland
Arts in Scotland
1985 in Scotland
Scottish comedy
English-language Scottish films
Films directed by Michael Hoffman
Films shot in Edinburgh
British road movies
EMI Films films
1985 comedy films
1980s English-language films
1980s British films